Sphaerexochus is a genus of trilobite from the Middle Ordovician to Late Silurian (468.1 to 418.7 Ma) of Asia, Australia, Europe, and North America.

The type species of the genus is Sphaerexochus mirus Beyrich 1845 (syn. of Sphaerexochus calvus Mc Coy 1846) . Similar and related genus is Pseudosphaerexochus.

Species

 Sphaerexochus arenosis  Chatterton and Ludvigsen 1977
 Sphaerexochus arenosus  Chatterton and Ludvigsen 1976
 Sphaerexochus atacius  Ludvigsen 1979
 Sphaerexochus brandlyi  Chatterton and Perry 1984
 Sphaerexochus bridgei  Cooper and Kindle 1936
 Sphaerexochus britanicus  Dean 1971
 Sphaerexochus calvus  Mc Coy 1846
 Sphaerexochus dimorphus  Whittington and Evitt 1953
 Sphaerexochus eurys  Tripp 1962
 Sphaerexochus fibrisulcatus  Lu 1975
 Sphaerexochus glaber  Holloway 1980
 Sphaerexochus hapsidotus  Whittington and Evitt 1953
 Sphaerexochus hiratai  Kobayashi and Hamada 1964
 Sphaerexochus hisingeri  Warburg 1925
 Sphaerexochus johnstoni  Chatterton and Perry 1984
 Sphaerexochus laciniatus  Lindström 1885
 Sphaerexochus latifrons  Angelin 1854
 Sphaerexochus molongloensis  Chatterton and Campbell 1980
 Sphaerexochus parvus  Billings 1865
 Sphaerexochus pulcher  Whittington and Evitt 1953
 Sphaerexochus romingeri  Hall 1868
 Sphaerexochus scabridus  Angelin 1854
 Sphaerexochus tuberculatus  Warburg 1925
 Sphaerexochus valcourensis  Shaw and Bolton 2011

Sources
 Fossils (Smithsonian Handbooks) by David Ward (Page 59)
 Sphaerexochus in the Paleobiology Database

Cheiruridae
Phacopida genera
Ordovician trilobites
Silurian trilobites
Paleozoic animals of Asia
Trilobites of Oceania
Trilobites of Europe
Trilobites of North America
Darriwilian first appearances
Silurian extinctions
Paleozoic life of the Northwest Territories
Paleozoic life of Nunavut
Paleozoic life of Quebec